The Karthauzer is a 1916 Hungarian film directed by Michael Curtiz.

Cast
 Alfréd Deésy
 Károly Lajthay as Armand (as Charles Lederle)

See also
 Michael Curtiz filmography

External links

Films directed by Michael Curtiz
1916 films
Hungarian black-and-white films
Hungarian silent films
Austro-Hungarian films